Osojnica is a small settlement on a stream with the same name, a tributary of the Poljane Sora, in the hills southwest of Žiri in the Upper Carniola region of Slovenia.

Name
The name Osojnica is derived from the Slovene common noun osoje 'shady side (of a slope)'. Related names in Slovene ethnic territory include Osojnik, Ossiach (in Austria), and Oseacco (in the Resia Valley in Italy).

History
Before the Second World War, Osojnica and the surrounding area were part of the Kingdom of Italy. The Italians built a small barracks in the settlement. After the war, the building was converted for residential use.

References

External links

Osojnica on Geopedia

Populated places in the Municipality of Žiri